The Brevetti is an automobile presented by Fiat in 1905 as a result of the acquisition of the Ansaldi company in the same year. From the Ansaldi, Fiat prepared the 10–12 HP, renamed “Brevetti” in 1906. A second series, the “Brevetti 2” was built from 1909.

The Brevetti was equipped with a 3052 cc engine producing . Both versions were assembled in the plant of Corso Dante in Turin.

References

Brevetti
Cars introduced in 1905
Brass Era vehicles